Procephalaspis is an extinct genus of jawless fish.

References

 Telling the Evolutionary Time: Molecular Clocks and the Fossil Record (Systematics Association Special Volume) by Philip C J Donoghue and M. Paul Smith (page 227)

Osteostraci genera
Silurian jawless fish